Datuk Syed Hashim bin Abdullah served as the National Chief Commissioner of the Persekutuan Pengakap Malaysia.
In 1974, he was awarded the 87th Bronze Wolf, the only distinction of the World Organization of the Scout Movement, awarded by the World Scout Committee for exceptional services to world Scouting.

References

External links

Recipients of the Bronze Wolf Award
Year of birth missing
Scouting and Guiding in Malaysia